Francis Leonard Bathe (born September 27, 1954) is a Canadian retired professional ice hockey defenceman who played nine seasons in the National Hockey League (NHL) with the Detroit Red Wings and Philadelphia Flyers.

Frank currently resides in Maine where he owns and operates Jetport Gas.

Playing career
The former Philadelphia Flyers defencemen is the son of Alan Bathe, who signed as a free agent with the Maple Leafs. Sporting a full beard and a head of shaggy red hair made him a true standout on the ice. He was known as a fighter. He won the Barry Ashbee Trophy for best defenceman, in 1982. A back injury ended his NHL career in 1984.

Currently residing in southern Maine, Bathe is a successful business owner and the father of five children. His son, Landon Bathe, followed in his father's footsteps to professional hockey only to encounter a similar career-ending injury and his daughter, Carrlyn Bathe is currently working as a sideline analyst for the Los Angeles Kings.

Career statistics

External links
 

1954 births
Canadian ice hockey defencemen
Detroit Red Wings players
Sportspeople from Oshawa
Kalamazoo Wings (1974–2000) players
Living people
Maine Mariners players
New Haven Nighthawks players
Philadelphia Flyers players
Port Huron Flags (IHL) players
Undrafted National Hockey League players
Virginia Wings players
Windsor Spitfires players
Ice hockey people from Ontario